The men's 500 metres competition at the 2020 European Speed Skating Championships was held on 11 January 2020.

Results
The race was started at 14:08.

References

Men's 500 metres